Toward the Low Sun is the eighth major album by Australian trio, Dirty Three. It was released the 24 February 2012, in the US.

The cover art is by guitarist Mick Turner.

Track listing
 "Furnace Skies" - 4:44
 "Sometimes I Forget You've Gone" - 3:46
 "Moon On The Land" - 4:51
 "Rising Below" - 5:47
 "The Pier" - 4:53
 "Rain Song" - 3:50
 "That Was Was" - 4:01
 "Ashen Snow" - 5:13
 "You Greet Her Ghost" - 4:50

Personnel 
Dirty Three
Warren Ellis – violin, keyboards
Mick Turner – organ, bass, guitar, artwork
Jim White – drums
Technical
Casey Rice – recording, mixing
Adam Rhodes - recording

References

2012 albums
Dirty Three albums